Chrysoesthia is a genus of moths in the family Gelechiidae.

Species
Chrysoesthia aletris (Walsingham, 1919)
Chrysoesthia atriplicella (Amsel, 1939)
Chrysoesthia boseae (Walsingham, 1908)
Chrysoesthia candidella (Chrétien, 1915)
Chrysoesthia compositella (Chrétien, 1915)
Chrysoesthia drurella (Fabricius, 1775)
Chrysoesthia eppelsheimi (Staudinger, 1885)
Chrysoesthia falkovitshi Lvovsky & Piskunov, 1989
Chrysoesthia gaditella (Staudinger, 1859)
Chrysoesthia halymella Amsel & Hering, 1931
Chrysoesthia heringi (Kuroko, 1961)
Chrysoesthia isocharis (Vári, 1963)
Chrysoesthia lingulacella (Clemens, 1860)
Chrysoesthia longifibriata M.M. Omelko & N.V. Omelko, 2010
Chrysoesthia luteola M.M. Omelko & N.V. Omelko, 2010
Chrysoesthia mimetis (Vári, 1963)
Chrysoesthia parilis (Vári, 1963)
Chrysoesthia sexguttella (Thunberg, 1794)
Chrysoesthia stipelloides (Janse, 1950)
Chrysoesthia verrucosa Tokár, 1999
Chrysoesthia versicolorella (Kearfott, 1908)

References

 , 1961: Descriptions of Microsetia sexguttella Thunberg and its allied new species from Japan. (Lepidoptera: Gelechiidae). Esakia 3: 1-8.
 ; ;  2009: Checklist of Gelechiidae (Lepidoptera) in America North of Mexico. Zootaxa, 2231: 1-39. Abstract & excerpt.
 , 2010: New find of the Subfamily Anomologinae (Lepidoptera, Gelechiidae) from the Primorsky district. Amurian zoological journal II(1): 52-56. (in Russian) Full article: .

 
Apatetrini